Domingos Paulo Andrade (born 7 May 2003) is an Angolan professional footballer who plays as defensive midfielder for Sporting CP B and the Angola national team.

Professional career
Andrade is a youth product of the Angolan club Interclube since he was 13. He joined Sporting CP B on 13 September 2021.

International career
Andrade debuted with the Angola national team in a 1–1 2022 FIFA World Cup qualification tie with Libya on 16 November 2021.

References

External links
 

2003 births
Living people
Footballers from Luanda
Angolan footballers
Angola international footballers
Angola youth international footballers
Association football midfielders
Sporting CP B players
Angolan expatriate footballers
Angolan expatriates in Portugal
Expatriate footballers in Portugal